Julie Byrne is an American singer, songwriter and guitarist from Buffalo, New York. To date, she has released two studio albums, Rooms With Walls and Windows (2014) and Not Even Happiness (2017).

Biography

Early life
Born and raised in Buffalo, New York, Julie Byrne was influenced by her father's guitar playing at an early age: "I grew up with the sound of his playing, which was fingerstyle guitar, so I would say that my style is completely rooted in his influence." At the age of seventeen, Byrne began learning the instrument herself, after her father could no longer play due to complications from multiple sclerosis: "The opportunity to play his instrument and honor the legacy of his craft and all of the time it took for him to cultivate a skill that he ultimately had to find a way to give up — it feels like a bit of an offering to him." At the age of 18, Byrne left Buffalo, living in various different cities in America, including, Pittsburgh, Northampton, Chicago, Lawrence, Seattle, and New Orleans.

Personal life
In addition to her recording and touring work, Byrne has studied Environmental Science, and, in 2016, worked at New York City's Central Park as a Seasonal Ranger. She notes, "[I] came to view it as a sanctuary, not only for New Yorkers to experience their connection to nature but also for the wildlife that take refuge there. And while the surrounding neighborhoods don’t reflect the same ethos, the parks really do belong to the people of New York and the parks department upholds that mission. I liked working in that form of service to the public."

Discography
Studio albums
Rooms With Walls and Windows (2014)
Not Even Happiness (2017)

EPs
You Would Love It Here (2012)
Julie Byrne (2013)

References

American women singer-songwriters
Living people
Singer-songwriters from New York (state)
Guitarists from New York (state)
1990 births
21st-century American women singers
21st-century American women guitarists
21st-century American guitarists